Huimin District is one of four districts of the prefecture-level city of Hohhot, the capital of Inner Mongolia Autonomous Region, North China. The district is designated as a Hui ethnic district.

Tourist attractions
 Great Mosque of Hohhot

References

www.xzqh.org 

County-level divisions of Inner Mongolia
Hui people
Hohhot